Beuvrequen is a commune in the Pas-de-Calais department in the Hauts-de-France region in northern France.

Geography
The A16 autoroute passes through the commune, forming its southeastern border.

Population

Sights
 The windmill de René.
 The church of St. Maxime, dating from the sixteenth century.

See also
Communes of the Pas-de-Calais department

References

Communes of Pas-de-Calais